Will-o'-the-Wisp is a Portuguese musical romantic comedy film, directed by João Pedro Rodrigues and released in 2022. The film stars Mauro Costa as Alfredo, the crown prince of Portugal whose passion for the environment leads him to become a fireman, where he falls in love with colleague Afonso (André Cabral).

The film contains a number of choreographed dance numbers set in the firehouse, and blends in deliberate anachronisms such as Alfredo directly quoting parts of Greta Thunberg's 2019 speech to the United Nations when trying to defend his choice to his disapproving family even though the film is set in 2011.

The film's cast also includes Joel Branco, Oceano Cruz, Margarida Vila-Nova, Miguel Loureiro, Dinis Vila-Nova, Luisa Castelo Branco, Vasco Redondo, Teresa Madruga, Ana Bustorff, João Mota, Paulo Bragança, Anabela Moreira, Raquel Rocha Vieira, Cláudia Jardim, Joana Barrios and João Villas-Boas.

Distribution

The film premiered in the Directors' Fortnight program at the 2022 Cannes Film Festival. It was subsequently screened at the Brussels International Film Festival, where it was the winner of the Grand Prix in the Directors' Week program. It had its North American premiere at the 2022 Toronto International Film Festival.

References

External links
 

2022 films
2022 comedy films
2022 independent films
2022 LGBT-related films
Films directed by João Pedro Rodrigues
Films set in Portugal
Films shot in Portugal
Gay-related films
LGBT-related romantic comedy films
Portuguese romantic comedy films
Portuguese musical comedy films
Portuguese LGBT-related films
Portuguese independent films
French romantic comedy films
French musical comedy films
French LGBT-related films
French independent films
2000s Portuguese-language films
2020s French films
2000s French films